Solved is an American true crime television series that airs on the Investigation Discovery network. The show also aired on TLC. Debuting on October 13, 2008, Solved is produced in conjunction with Digital Ranch Productions.

Synopsis
The series features career-defining cases of police officers and FBI agents, with a heavy emphasis on forensic evidence. In each episode, a mysterious homicide case unfolds through first person accounts from America's elite law enforcement officers.

Topics covered include forensic document examination, forensic linguistics, and computer forensics.

CGI environments are used to illustrate crime scenes, physical evidence, and various high-tech crime fighting techniques.

See also
 Cold Case Files, USA/A&E, 1999 (true cases)
 Cold Justice, USA/TNT, 2013 (true cases)
 To Catch a Killer, CAN/OWN, 2014 (true cases)

References

External links 
 
 

2000s American documentary television series
2008 American television series debuts
2010 American television series endings
2010s American documentary television series
2000s American crime television series
2010s American crime television series
English-language television shows
Investigation Discovery original programming
True crime television series